Kubaryiellus kubaryi is a species of small air-breathing land snails, terrestrial pulmonate gastropod mollusks in the family Charopidae. This species is endemic to Micronesia.

References

Fauna of Micronesia
Kubaryiellus
Gastropods described in 1900
Taxonomy articles created by Polbot